Molly Maid is an international franchise with over 400 individual franchisees throughout the world. They are listed on the Franchise 500 List and one of America’s Top Global Franchises by Entrepreneur Magazine.

History
Molly Maid was founded in Canada in 1979 by Adrienne and Chris Stringer The company was named after the character Molly Brown from the 1964  film The Unsinkable Molly Brown.

Today the company has over 400 active Franchises across the globe. Molly Maid expanded into the United States in 1984.

Areas of Business
Molly Maid has expanded across Canada, the United Kingdom, Japan, Portugal, and the United States.  The company performs more than two million home cleanings per year.

Corporate Governance/ Board of Directors
Headquartered in Oakville, Ontario, the Chairman and CEO of Molly Maid is Jim MacKenzie.

Ms. Molly Foundation
Ms. Molly Foundation, an anti-domestic violence foundation, began in 1996, collects money and goods for safe houses and shelters for victims of domestic violence.

Donation totals by year:
2010 - $167,836
2009 - $146,900
2008 - $127,500

References

External links
Official Website

Cleaning companies
Service companies of Canada
Companies based in Mississauga